Zebediela  is a group of villages in Capricorn District Municipality, Limpopo Province, South Africa. It is south-east of Polokwane, next to Lebowakgomo. It is well known for the production of citrus fruits, mainly oranges.

Zebediela is home to the Zebediela Citrus Estate, one of the largest citrus estates in the country. Most of the citrus products produced at the estate are exported to the international market; the rest are supplied to local markets.

The dominant language in the area is Northern Sotho. The second most commonly spoken native language is 'Sedhebele sa se Moledlane' which is a home language of the Kekana royal family. Minority languages spoken in the area include Afrikaans, Venda, and Tsonga.

Etymology 
The proper name of the group of villages is Sebetiela, named after a former Ndebele chief of the area. However, the association with citrus fruit production led to the use of Zebediela instead. It is also known colloquially as "ZB", "Zbee", or Dinamuneng ("place of oranges").

List of villages 
These are the primary villages which compose Zebedelia:
Moletlane
Mogoto
Mathibela
Rakgwatha
Matome
Makushwaneng
Madisha Leolo
Motserereng
Madisha Ditoro
Magatle
Mapatjakeng
Makweng
Ga-Mamogwaša
Rafiri
Molapo
Makgophong
Drogte
Volop
Bolahlakgomo
Dicheung
Beldrif
Malatane

Each village within Zebediela has their own chief or inDuna, which in turn are beholden to the King, the royal leader of Zebediela.

Attractions 
Local tourist attractions include the Leshoka Thabang Game Reserve (next to Ga-Rafiri) and Zebediela Country Club in Farm Kleinwonder.

Zebediela Plaza is the main shopping center for all of the surrounding villages.

A local favorite night spot is "Andy's Pub", also known as "Ga Stan", in Mathibela township. Casablanca Tavern, located across from Zebediela Plaza, is also very popular.

Maliming Lodge, on the outskirts of Moletlane, serves as accommodation for commuters visiting the area. Other lodging includes The Bridge Boutique, which also hosts fashion events and musical gigs.

Notable people 
Notable natives of Zebediela include singer-songwriters Umanji and Steve Kekana, as well as singer/rapper Senyaka.

Well-known football players Alex Bapela, Hlompho Kekana, Amanda Manku, Paseka Mako, Puleng Tloloane, and Motjeka Madisha are from Zebediela, as well as Phalane, a footballer in the DSTV League.

Ramaranka Mogotlane, Dr. Edith Kekana-Phaswana, businesswoman Florence Nkuna-Mabobo, and Seponono Kekana also hail from Zebediela.

Healthcare 

Groothoek Hospital was one of the biggest hospitals in the northern province before it was shut down. Zebediela Hospital in Magatle and Lebowakgomo Hospital now serve the villages.

Other healthcare providers include Unjani Clinic in Moletlane, as well as many other private general health practitioners and traditional doctors.

References

Populated places in the Lepelle-Nkumpi Local Municipality